Plas-y-Nant is an unstaffed halt on the narrow gauge Welsh Highland Railway.

History
A halt at Plas-y-Nant was first used in the 1920s but closed with the line in 1936. 
This new halt near the northern end of Llyn Cwellyn was opened on 15 May 2005. The train services are operated by the Festiniog Railway Company's Welsh Highland Railway subsidiary and trains call only by request.

Despite some initial hostility to the railway and local objections to a halt, former visitors to the outdoor centre Plas-y-Nant raised and funded the entire amount to pay for its construction and turned out in force with members of the local community on the opening day for a train ride to Rhyd Ddu and back.

Facilities
During rebuilding from Waunfawr to Rhyd Ddu (between 2001 and 2003), consideration was given to establishing a temporary terminus at Plas-y-nant during the spring of 2003. Although the 2003 timetable was published with this option, the loop was never completed. An engineer's siding was provided but was later removed.

At present, the halt only has a platform but there are plans for a waiting shelter.

External links
The Welsh Highland Railway Project – official reconstruction site
Welsh Highland Railway (Caernarfon)
Rebuilding The Welsh Highland Railway – an independent site
Welsh Highland Railway Timetables
Multimap Map of Plas-y-Nant

Heritage railway stations in Gwynedd
Welsh Highland Railway
Railway stations in Great Britain opened in 2005